"Release Me" is a song performed by Australian singer-songwriter, Zoë Badwi. The single was co-written by Badwi, Ivan Gough, Grant Smillie and Colin Snape. It was released digitally on 15 November 2008. "Release Me" reached number one on the ARIA Clubs Chart and received two nominations including "Best Dance Release" at the 2009 ARIA Music Awards and "Dance Work of the Year" at the 2010 APRA Awards.

Background 
In an interview with Auspop, Badwi stated that while she was playing with her band at a venue in Melbourne, Grant Smillie of Australian duo TV Rock was having a Sunday afternoon drink and that she saw him tapping his foot. "He came up to me afterwards and he said You’re great, do you write your own stuff?. I said, yeah, I sure do and he said, I’ll send you some beats – and we’ll see what happens. So he sent me some beats and I wrote "Release Me" and went around to sing it to him and the other guy from TV Rock [Ivan Gough] and they both just said yep, we love it."

Music video 
The music video for "Release Me" was filmed during a performance by Badwi at the Sensation Dance Party on New Year's Eve 2008. She explained, "They were just looking for someone to sing on the new years eve countdown. And then they asked me and we thought it was being filmed anyway, we should see about using that as my film clip for the single. Turns out they used it as promo for the party all over the world." It was released on 15 January 2009.

Charts 
"Release Me" reached number one on the ARIA Clubs Chart and stayed in that position for seven weeks.

Track listings 
Digital download
 Release Me (TV Rock Edit) – 3:26
 Release Me (J Nitti Mix) – 6:22

Italy vinyl
 Release Me (TV Rock edit) – 6:45
 Release Me (Mind Electric Mix) – 5:38
 Release Me (J Nitti Mix) – 6:22
 Release Me (Ryan Riback "Raise Your Hands" Mix) – 6:34

UK CDr
 Release Me (Radio Edit) – 3:31
 Release Me (TV Rock Mix) – 6:50
 Release Me (J Nitti Mix) – 6:27
 Release Me (Ryan Riback Mix) – 6:39
 Release Me (Mind Electric 12" Mix) – 5:41
 Release Me (Mind Electric Dub Mix) – 5:41

AUS/UK Remixes
 Release Me (UK Radio Edit) – 3:04
 Release Me (TV Rock Edit) – 6:45
 Release Me (Cahill Radio Edit) – 3:30
 Release Me (Cahill Club Mix) – 6:23
 Release Me (Pitron & Sanna Mix) – 8:15
 Release Me (Niels Van Gogh Mix) – 6:07

Release history

References 

2008 singles
Zoë Badwi songs
House music songs
2008 songs